It's Your Night is the debut album by American singer-songwriter James Ingram, released by Qwest Records/Warner Records on July 27, 1983. The album was commercially successful, as it peaked at number 46 on the Billboard 200 album chart and reached number 10 on the Top R&B/Hip Hop Albums chart. It was later certified music recording certification by the Recording Industry Association of America (RIAA) in early 1984, making this his highest-charting album and only RIAA-certified album.

The aforementioned album and its parent singles were nominated for quadruple Grammy Awards for both 1984 and 1985, with "Yah Mo B There" winning for Best R&B Performance by a Duo or Group.

Reception

It is also his first on Qwest Records, which was run by Quincy Jones. It features the song "Yah Mo B There", which is a duet with singer Michael McDonald. It has been certified gold by the Recording Industry Association of America and is his highest-charting album ever.

Track listing
All tracks are produced by Quincy Jones.

Personnel

 James Ingram – lead vocals (all tracks), synthesizers (1, 2, 8), synth bass (1), arrangements (1, 2), backing vocals (2, 8), keyboards (8)
 Michael Boddicker – synthesizers (1–3, 8)
 Greg Phillinganes – keyboards (1, 4), synthesizers (1, 4, 6), acoustic piano (6)
 Mark Vieha – synthesizers (1), arrangements (1)
 Craig Hundley – synthesizer programming (1, 4-6), synthesizers (4)
 Quincy Jones – arrangements (1–3, 7, 9), African voices (2), electric piano (3)
 Michael McDonald – synthesizers (2), arrangements (2), lead and backing vocals (2)
 Rod Temperton – synthesizers (2, 6), arrangements (2)
 Robbie Buchanan – keyboards (3), synthesizers (3, 8), arrangements (3)
 Don Dorsey – synthesizers (3)
 David Paich – synthesizers (3, 7, 9), arrangements (7)
 David Foster – keyboards (5), synthesizers (5), acoustic piano (9), arrangements (9)
 Ian Underwood – synthesizer programming (5, 6) 
 Jimmy Smith – organ (6), synthesizers (6)
 Steve Porcaro – synthesizer programming (7, 9)
 Paul Jackson Jr. – guitar (1, 4, 8, 9)
 Larry Carlton – guitar (3)
 George Doering – guitar (9)
 Louis Johnson – bass guitar (1, 8)
 Abe Laboriel – bass guitar (7)
 Nathan East – bass guitar (9)
 Harvey Mason Sr. – drums (1)
 John Robinson – drums (2, 4, 5, 7, 8)
 Raymond Calhoun – drums (3)
 Leon "Ndugu" Chancler – drums (9)
 Paulinho Da Costa – percussion (2, 4, 5, 8)

 Steve Ray – fingerpopper (8)
 Ernie Watts – tenor sax solo (4)
 Larry Williams – saxophone (4, 6)
 Tom Scott – lyricon (5), saxophone (6), lyricon solo (8) 
 Bill Reichenbach Jr. – trombone (4, 6)
 Gary Grant – trumpet (4, 6), flugelhorn (4)
 Jerry Hey – trumpet (4, 6), flugelhorn (4)
 Johnny Mandel – arrangements (9)
 Ollie E. Brown – backing vocals (1)
 Zane Giles – backing vocals (1)
 Jim Gilstrap – backing vocals (1)
 Susaye Greene Brown – backing vocals (1)
 Howard Hewett – backing vocals (1, 6)
 Bunny Hull – backing vocals (1, 8)
 David Pack - backing vocals (2)
 Phillip Ingram – backing vocals (1)
 Augie Johnson – backing vocals (1)
 Valerie Johnson – backing vocals (1)
 Scherrie Payne – backing vocals (1)
 Luther Vandross – backing vocals (1)
 Tom Bahler – backing vocals (6)
 Linda Harmon – backing vocals (6)
 Edie Lehmann – backing vocals (6)
 Paulette McWilliams – backing vocals (8)
 Carmen Twillie – backing vocals (8)
 Maxine Willard Waters – backing vocals (8)
 Patti Austin – lead and backing vocals (9)

Production 

 Producer – Quincy Jones
 Co-Producer on Track 9 – Johnny Mandel
 Production Assistants – Steve Ray and Mark Ross
 Tracks 1-8 recorded and mixed by Bruce Swedien
 Track 9 recorded by Joel Moss
 Additional Recording and Technical Director – Matt Forger

 Assistant Engineers – Steve Bates, Ric Butz, Mark Ettel and Greg Laney.
 Mastered by Bernie Grundman at A&M Studios (Hollywood, CA).
 Art Direction – Simon Levy and Jeri McManus
 Design – Jeri McManus
 Photography – Matthew Rolston
 Sleeve Notes – James Ingram and Quincy Jones

Popular culture
The song "Whatever We Imagine" was used as the closing theme for both 1984 NCAA Division I men's basketball tournament and 1986 NBA Finals for CBS Sports.

Charts

Weekly charts

Year-end charts

Certifications

References

1983 debut albums
James Ingram albums
Qwest Records albums
Warner Records albums
Albums arranged by Johnny Mandel
Albums produced by Quincy Jones